Hard Bargain is a historic home located at Charlottesville, Virginia. It was built in 1878, and is a two-story, three-bay, Late Victorian style frame dwelling.  It is sheathed in weatherboard and sits on a brick English basement.  It has a large two-story rear addition (1890s), one-story bay window, and projecting end pavilion. Also on the property are the contributing stone foundation of an old barn and the remains of a mill on Schenk's Branch.

It was listed on the National Register of Historic Places in 1984.

References

Houses on the National Register of Historic Places in Virginia
Victorian architecture in Virginia
Houses completed in 1878
Houses in Charlottesville, Virginia
National Register of Historic Places in Charlottesville, Virginia